Appian Way Productions is a Los Angeles based film and television production company founded in 2001 by actor and producer Leonardo DiCaprio. Jennifer Davisson serves as President of Production. Since its launch, Appian Way has released a diverse slate of films, including Alejandro Iñárritu's three-time Academy Award and Golden Globe winner The Revenant, Martin Scorsese’s Academy Award and Golden Globe nominated The Wolf of Wall Street and Academy Award nominated and Golden Globe winning The Aviator, along with Shutter Island, Scott Cooper’s Out of the Furnace, George Clooney’s Golden Globe nominated The Ides of March, the psychological thriller Orphan and the film adaptation of Dennis Lehane’s critically acclaimed novel Live by Night with Ben Affleck, among others. The television adaptation of The Right Stuff based on the acclaimed Tom Wolfe book for National Geographic which premiered on Disney+ in October 2020.

In recent years, the company has put forth strong efforts to gain headway in the documentary world, especially as it pertains to progressive environmental change. Appian Way recently worked in partnership with the History Channel on Frontiersman, and National Geographic to produce Before the Flood, a documentary film that sheds light on that aforementioned change. It also worked with Netflix on the Academy Award nominated Virunga, directed by Orlando von Einsiedel, and Kip Anderson's Cowspiracy: The Sustainability Secret. Appian is in partnership with Netflix on several additional documentaries, including critically acclaimed The Ivory Game, How to Change the World and Catching the Sun. Recently released projects include; Sea of Shadows with National Geographic, which won the Audience Award at the 2019 Sundance Film Festival, Ice on Fire with HBO, along with And We Go Green which premiered at the 2019 Toronto Film Festival.

The company's first film was The Assassination of Richard Nixon (2004), which was screened at the 57th Cannes Film Festival. In the company's second film, the 2004 biopic The Aviator, DiCaprio starred as Howard Hughes. The film was a critical and commercial success, and earned several Academy Award nominations, including Best Picture. Its following productions were released three years later—the comedy drama Gardener of Eden (2007) and the documentary The 11th Hour (2007). DiCaprio secured a three-season television series Greensburg (2008–2010) for the company.

Appian Way produced three profitable films from 2009 to 2010, the mob drama Public Enemies (2009), the psychological horror Orphan (2009) and the psychological thriller Shutter Island (2010). Three films were released by Appian Way in 2011, none of which were particularly successful. The company had three releases in 2013, including the biopic The Wolf of Wall Street (2013), which was a critical and commercial success. Banned in several countries for its controversial scenes, the film was downloaded illegally over 30 million times via BitTorrent sites. The Revenant (2015) followed, a highly successful western thriller about the life of the frontiersman Hugh Glass.

History

2001–2010
Appian Way Productions was founded by Leonardo DiCaprio in 2001. It takes its name from the Italian road of the same name. Its first film was The Assassination of Richard Nixon (2004), starring Sean Penn as Samuel Byck, who attempted to assassinate US president Richard Nixon in 1974. It was screened in the Un Certain Regard section at the 2004 Cannes Film Festival. The company's next film was the 2004 biopic The Aviator, produced in association with Forward Pass, Intermedia, and Initial Entertainment Group. Based on the 1993 non-fiction book Howard Hughes: The Secret Life by Charles Higham, the film depicted the life of Howard Hughes (DiCaprio), an aviation pioneer who became a successful film producer between the late 1920s and late 1940s while simultaneously growing more unstable due to severe obsessive–compulsive disorder. Writing for The Daily Telegraph, Sukhdev Sandhu described the film as "a gorgeous tribute to the Golden Age of Hollywood" even though it "tips the balance of spectacle versus substance in favour of the former". He praised Martin Scorsese's direction, DiCaprio and the supporting cast. The film proved to be a commercial success, with a worldwide gross of $213.7 million against a budget of $110 million. It earned a total of eleven nominations at the 77th Academy Awards, including Best Picture, Best Director (Scorsese) and Best Actor (DiCaprio), and won five of them, including a Best Supporting Actress award for Cate Blanchett.

Kevin Connolly, a close friend of DiCaprio, directed Appian Way's next film—the comedy drama Gardener of Eden (2007), which, according to The Hollywood Reporter'''s Frank Scheck, "lack[ed] the necessary dramatic urgency or black humor to connect with audiences". A few months later, Appian Way released The 11th Hour, a documentary about global warming. The film, featuring 50 experts who suggested solutions to various environmental problems, won the Earthwatch Environmental Film Award through the National Geographic Channel in March 2008. DiCaprio wrote a three-season television series Greensburg (2008–10) which was produced by the company.

Appian Way later produced another biopic, Public Enemies (2009), a Michael Mann-directed mob drama starring Johnny Depp and Christian Bale. Following the final years of the notorious bank robber John Dillinger (Depp) as he is pursued by FBI agent Melvin Purvis during Great Depression, the film was an adaptation of Bryan Burrough's non-fiction book Public Enemies: America's Greatest Crime Wave and the Birth of the FBI, 1933–34. A commercial success, it also received generally positive reviews, though critics found historical inaccuracies in the film. The company, along with Dark Castle Entertainment, released the 2009 psychological horror film Orphan, which told the story of a couple who, after the death of their unborn child, adopt a mysterious 9-year-old girl. The film was considered by the adoption community to promote negative stereotypes about orphans. Although the film received mixed reviews, it was a commercial success.

Scorsese reunited with the company to make the film Shutter Island (2010), a psychological thriller based on the 2003 novel of same name by Dennis Lehane. DiCaprio played U.S. Marshal Edward "Teddy" Daniels, who investigates a psychiatric facility located on an island but eventually comes to question his own sanity. A commercial success, the film received generally positive reviews; Peter Bradshaw of The Guardian praised the film's direction and performances but criticized its "silly twist ending", calling it "supremely exasperating".

2011 onwardRed Riding Hood, directed by Catherine Hardwicke, was Appian Way's first release in 2011. The film, set in a village haunted by werewolves, follows a young girl who falls in love with an orphan woodcutter, much to her family's displeasure. Earlier in production, the film was titled The Girl with the Red Riding Hood. Although it was poorly received by critics—Mary Pols of Time named it one of the Top 10 Worst Movies of 2011—it had moderate box-office returns. The company's second release in 2011 was Detachment, a Tony Kaye-directed drama about the high school education system. George Clooney directed and co-produced the company's final film of the year The Ides of March, which is based on Beau Willimon's play Farragut North. Starring Ryan Gosling, Clooney and Philip Seymour Hoffman, this political drama takes place during a presidential primary, when an ambitious press secretary (Gosling) becomes embroiled in a political scandal. The film received positive reviews; one from The Guardian praised the direction and the performances of the cast.

Three films were produced by Appian Way in 2013; the first was Runner Runner, an ensemble crime thriller, which The Guardian Xan Brooks described as "a lazy, trashy film that barely goes through the motions". The thriller Out of the Furnace, the company's second release, was also negatively received by critics and was a box office bomb. Scorsese directed the company's final film in 2013—The Wolf of Wall Street, a biopic on the life of Jordan Belfort (DiCaprio), a New York stockbroker who runs a firm that engages in securities fraud and money laundering on Wall Street in the 1990s. The screenplay was adapted by Terence Winter from Belfort's memoir of the same name. The film was banned in Kenya, Malaysia and Nepal for its controversial depiction of events, explicit sexual content, profanity, and hard drug use. Nonetheless, it was a commercial success, becoming the 17th-highest-grossing film of 2013. According to copyright infringement tracking site Excipio, the film was the most widely infringed of 2014, as it was downloaded illegally over 30 million times via BitTorrent sites. It was nominated for several Academy Awards, including Best Picture and Best Actor, although it failed to win in any category.

In 2015, DiCaprio produced and co-starred with Tom Hardy and Domhnall Gleeson in The Revenant, directed by Alejandro González Iñárritu. This biographical western thriller is based on in part on Michael Punke's 2002 novel of the same name, which itself was inspired by the frontiersman Hugh Glass's survival after being mauled by a grizzly bear in 1823. Co-produced with Regency Enterprises, RatPac-Dune Entertainment, Anonymous Content and M Productions, the film was well received with particular praise for the performances, direction and cinematography. "Bleak as hell but considerably more beautiful, this nightmarish plunge into a frigid, forbidding American outback is a movie of pitiless violence, grueling intensity and continually breathtaking imagery", according to Justin Change of Variety. Built on a budget of $135 million, the film earned $533 million worldwide. The Revenant received 12 nominations at the 88th Academy Awards, and won three, including Best Director and Best Actor.

In May 2016, Appian Way Productions signed a three-year, first-look production deal with Paramount Pictures. In December 2016, the company released Live by Night, based on the 2012 novel of same name by Dennis Lehane. Directed by, written by and starring Ben Affleck, this Prohibition-era gangster drama received largely unenthusiastic reviews and failed to recoup its $65 million production budget. Also that year, the company produced four documentaries, Davi's Way, The Last Shaman, The Ivory Game and Before the Flood, the last of which won the Evening Standard British Film Award for Best Documentary.

In 2017, Appian Way produced Under the Bed, a television film thriller about a young woman trying to get over a breakup, while befriending a stalker on social media.  In association with Blumhouse Productions and GK Films, the company will produce Delirium, a supernatural horror film scheduled for a 2017 release.

More recently, the studio signed first-look deals with Apple for documentaries and television and with Sony Pictures Entertainment for feature films.

Films

Television
 Greensburg (2008–10)
 Under the Bed (2017)
 Pete the Cat (2018–present)
 Grant (2020)
 The Right Stuff (2020)
 Shining Girls'' (2022–present)

Documentaries

Notes

Footnotes

References

Leonardo DiCaprio
2001 establishments in California
American companies established in 2001
Companies based in West Hollywood, California
Entertainment companies based in California
Mass media companies established in 2001
Film production companies of the United States
Television production companies of the United States